The German Bar Association (German: Deutscher Anwaltverein – DAV) is a voluntary association of German and German-speaking lawyers. It seeks to safeguard, protect and promote the professional and economic interests of the Bar, notary lawyers included, especially by promoting fair administration of justice and legislation, education and further training, encouragement of professional solidarity and scientific spirit among lawyers.

The German Bar Association observes political and confessional neutrality and places great emphasis on respect for human rights and the rule of law. Furthermore, it promotes gender equality.

Structure and Organization 
The DAV represents the German legal profession and aims at uniting all 160.000 lawyers in Germany and German lawyers abroad. Currently it has app. 66.000 individual members, organized in 259 local bar associations, 13 of which are based outside Germany (Brazil, France (2), Greece, Italy, Netherlands, Luxembourg, Poland, Portugal, Spain, Turkey, Ukraine, and United Kingdom).

Aims and Activities 
With offices in Berlin and Brussels the German Bar Association has an abundance of solid institutional mechanisms and practiced instruments, as is necessary for a strong lobbying practice which is specifically tailored to the special characteristics of national and European legislative processes. Primarily relevant in this context is its direct influence on federal and state legislative and executive branches – both through the federal association as well as through the DAV local bar associations. The DAV has an extremely effective network of close personal contacts to political decision-makers and other influential persons, in Berlin, state capitals, and Brussels.

Since the establishment of the German Bar Association its legislative committees have supported and enriched the work of the Executive Board and the management. The legislative committees are composed of members of the legal profession who serve on a voluntary basis. It is the task of the legislative committees to formulate opinions on all relevant draft legislation on the German and European level.

Publications 
The German Bar Association publishes the Anwaltsblatt, a monthly journal for lawyers that strictly focuses on the practice of law. The Anwaltsblatt regularly addresses questions regarding taxes and liability and publishes current judgments in the areas of fees and the law of professional rules.

The DAV Annual Conference 
Every year, the German Bar Association organizes the DAV Annual Conference Deutscher Anwaltstag. The DAV Annual Conference is the yearly meeting of the German legal profession dedicated to legal policy and sociopolitical issues. Participants are regularly at least 1800 legal practitioners with different professional backgrounds as well as representatives from politics, the judiciary and science. The DAV Annual Conference usually receives immense attention in the media. It is the biggest event of its kind in Germany.

Membership 
The German Bar Association is a member of the following international organisations: American Bar Association (ABA), Council of Bars and Law Societies of Europe (CCBE), European Company Lawyers Association (ECLA), International Association of Young Lawyers (AIJA), International Bar Association (IBA), International Criminal Bar (ICB), Union Internationale des Avocats (UIA).

External links 
 Deutscher Anwaltverein
 Deutsche Anwaltauskunft
 Deutscher Anwaltstag
 Anwaltsblatt

References 
Deutscher Anwaltverein (Hg.): Anwälte und ihre Geschichte. Zum 140. Gründungsjahr des Deutschen Anwaltvereins, Verlag Mohr Siebeck, Tübingen 2011 

Bar associations of Europe
Legal organisations based in Germany